Molk Sar (also Romanized as Molk-e Sar; also known as Molk Sarā and Mul’kasar) is a village in Taher Gurab Rural District, in the Central District of Sowme'eh Sara County, Gilan Province, Iran. At the 2006 census, its population was 680, in 172 families.

References 

Populated places in Sowme'eh Sara County